Van Dyck or Vandyck is a Dutch toponymic surname meaning "from (the) dike", originally written Van Dijck. Notable people with the surname include:

Abraham van Dyck (1635–1680), Dutch painter (preferred spelling "van Dijck")
Albert Van Dyck (1902–1951), Belgian painter
Anthony van Dyck (1599–1641), Flemish artist, court painter in England
Christopher H. van Dyck (born 1955), American neuroscientist
Cornelius Van Alen Van Dyck (1819–1895), American missionary
Edouard Van Dyck (1918–1977), Belgian professional road bicycle racer
Elisabeth Van Dyck (1951–1979), German member of the Red Army Faction
Ernest van Dyck (1861–1923), Belgian dramatic tenor
Floris van Dyck (1575–1651), Dutch painter
Henry H. Van Dyck (1809–1888), New York politician
Jeff van Dyck (born 1969), Australian video game music composer
Marijuana Pepsi Vandyck, American educator
Max Van Dyck (1902–1992), Belgian painter
Steve Van Dyck, Australian zoologist and museum curator
Vedder Van Dyck (1889–1960), American Episcopal bishop
William Vandyck, British actor and children's author
William V. B. Van Dyck (1875–1981), American football player, electrical engineer, and businessman

See also
Van Dijck
Van Dijk
Van Dyk
Van Dyke (disambiguation)
Walther von Dyck (1856–1934), German mathematician
Dick Van Dyke, American actor and comedian
Anthony Van Dyck (horse) (2016-2020), Irish thoroughbred race horse

Dutch-language surnames
Surnames of Belgian origin
Surnames of Dutch origin